Ernesto Jafeth Cabrera Franco (Guatemala City, 28 November 1948) is a Guatemalan politician who served as Vice President of Guatemala from 2016 to 2020.

Early life and career
Cabrera studied at the Universidad de San Carlos de Guatemala, where he obtained a degree in medicine and surgery. He was Rector of the University between 1994 and 1998.

Political career
Cabrera's political career started in 1999 when he was one of the founders of the National Unity of Hope with Álvaro Colom. Cabrera left the party shortly afterwards. In 2004 he became Secretary for Agricultural Affairs.

In May 2015, Caberera was announced as the National Convergence Front candidate for the office of Vice President for the 2015 elections. He was attached to Jimmy Morales as presidential candidate.

In September 2015 Cabrera announced that he believed that one of the causes Guatemala's problems was to be found in the Spanish colonization of the Americas, stating that if Guatemala had been taken over by another country the problems would not have been so grave.

On 6 November 2015 Cabrera was officially declared as Vice President-elect by the Supreme Electoral Tribunal of Guatemala.

Personal life
His son, Jafeth Ernesto Cabrera Cortéz, was elected to the Congress of Guatemala for the National Convergence Front in the 2015 parliamentary elections. He could however not take up his seat due to a law prohibiting relatives of the President and Vice-President from becoming deputies.

References

1951 births
Living people
Vice presidents of Guatemala
Guatemalan politicians
20th-century Guatemalan judges
Guatemalan diplomats
People from Guatemala City
Universidad de San Carlos de Guatemala alumni
Academic staff of Universidad de San Carlos de Guatemala